"Mammamia" is a song by Italian rock band Måneskin, released on 8 October 2021 through Epic Records and Sony Music as the lead single of their third studio album, Rush! (2023). Described as a dance-punk and rock song with dance influence, it was composed by all of the band members and co-produced with Fabrizio Ferraguzzo. Written solely by the band's frontman Damiano David, the lyrics depicts a person who tries to express themselves, but they are limited by non-understanding society. Additionally, some lines were written in response to the criticism that the band's frontman received. Praised for its "rough" sound, the song was compared to the group's previous single, "I Wanna Be Your Slave".

Commercially, "Mammamia" peaked within the top 10 of the charts in Italy and Lithuania. It charted in 16 other countries and has been certified platinum in Italy by the Federazione Industria Musicale Italiana (FIMI). An accompanying music video directed by Rei Nadal premiered on YouTube on 19 October 2021. In the clip, the band is seen coming back from a party where David acted annoying towards his bandmates, thus they imagine killing him in different ways. The song has been performed by Måneskin on The Tonight Show Starring Jimmy Fallon, 2021 MTV Europe Music Awards, ALTer EGO, and Loud Kids Tour, which included a gig on 2022 Coachella.

Background and release
Following their win at the Sanremo Music Festival 2021 in the "Big Artists" category with "Zitti e buoni", Måneskin was chosen to represent Italy in the Eurovision Song Contest 2021, which they went on to win. During the event, the band's frontman Damiano David has been accused of taking cocaine, however allegations turned out to be fake, since the singer passed a voluntary drugs test. After the contest, Måneskin felt inspired and happy, and a few days later they wrote "Mammamia" in few hours. Their intention was creating a song that is "funny and entertaining", instead of something "too serious or too heavy", however they touched on being misunderstood and misjudged by media in the lyrics. The band's bassist, Victoria De Angelis, said: "We didn't take it too seriously. It's a very silly, careless song and we've never done something like that before. It came together very naturally. We just tried to have fun and enjoy it, because [it was written] in a moment where we were experiencing a lot of things."

Before the single's release, Måneskin members had been spotted wearing belts with "Mammamia" written on them. On September 30, 2021, the band announced release of "Mammamia". Its cover art shows David sliding his hand down the pants wearing a "Mammamia" belt. In the following days, the group members posted the song's snippets to video-sharing app TikTok, while on their Twitter, they posted nude pictures of themselves with the caption "Why so hot?" On 7 October, Måneskin hosted a press conference in SO36 club, Berlin, where they debuted the single live and were interviewed. The next day, "Mammamia" was officially made available for digital download and streaming. On the day of its release, the track also impacted Italian radio airplay through Sony Music, with the title capitalised. Also on 8 October 2021, Arista Records serviced it to the US alternative, hot adult contemporary, and mainstream radio formats. On 19 November, a 12-inch vinyl was released by Epic Records that features a demo version of "Touch Me" as its B-side. The final rendition of the track was added as a bonus track of the Japanese edition of Rush!.

Music and lyrics
Influenced by dance music, "Mammamia" is a dance-punk and rock song composed and produced by the band's members, and co-produced by Fabrizio Ferraguzzo. Claudio Cabona of Rockol opined that the track has a pop rock mix and, among other music critics, pointed out the resemblance to Måneskin's previous single "I Wanna Be Your Slave". It contains a "catchy melody", "scratchy angular" guitar, "distorted" bass, "relentless" drums, and "gravelly" vocals. The track ends with a "dense final part where the rhythm accelerates further".

The first verse of "Mammamia" describes a situation where someone tries to express themselves, however they are limited by others due to their misunderstanding of the one's intentions. The chorus contains a sexual reference, which David explained as a way of showcase that "you can have tastes or preferences that people think are strange, but which are lived in a very innocent way". The title line was originally written as a gibberish to fill up space during the song's development, though was kept in the song since the band members liked it. David also stated that the line captures "how people will react to what you're doing, but we also wanted to make fun of the Italian stereotype because we feel like we're very far from that". The second verse was written in response to drug usage allegations towards Måneskin and criticism of its leader, who was drunk during Eurovision press conference. According to the singer, the song's "vulgar" bridge should be taken at its face value.

Reception
"Mammamia" has been described as "rambunctious" by Yohann Ruelle of Pure Charts. In an article published by DIY staff, the track was labelled as a "dazzling stomper". Writing for Jenesaispop, Sebas E. Alonso deemed the song "simple" with "ad nauseam repetition of 'Spit your love on me' phrase", he complimented it as "100% effective". In an article by TgCom24 staff, the track has been described as a "rough and rock piece, tinged with self-irony". Andrea Campana from La Scimmia Pensa called the single "powerful" with a "memorable riff, unstoppable energy and irresisible catchy melody". Jeremy D. Larson of Pitchfork was not kean of the song, saying its "martial unison" performance "brings to mind fourth-grade band practice, or migraines".

Commercially, "Mammamia" appeared on 18 national charts, peaking within top ten in two of them, in Måneskin's home country, Italy, debuting there at number six, and in Lithuania, where it peaked at number two. Additionally, the track was certified platinum by Federazione Industria Musicale Italiana (FIMI) for selling over 100,000 copies in Italy. The track peaked at position 67 on the Billboard Global 200 chart.

Music video

Following teaser photos shared via their Instagram, the music video for "Mammamia" premiered on Måneskin's official YouTube channel on 19 October 2021. The video amassed 1.5 million views in 24 hours of its release. The clip containing an epilepsy warning was directed by Spanish director Rei Nadal and produced by Prettybird. Its premise is that while coming back from the party, all of the band members fantasise about killing David, whose behavior is boring according to them.

Featuring "acid" and "pulp" colours, the video begins with De Angelis commenting that "[David is] so fucking annoying". First, it cuts to the drummer Ethan Torchio's fantasy, where he drowns David in a toilet which they both urinated in earlier. After that, a writing appears on the bathroom's wall, reading "rest in piss". The next fantasy is De Angelis' one, where she is interrupted by the singer while kissing with a female fan. She chooses to kill him with a kitchen knife. Måneskin guitarist Thomas Raggi's fantasy is the last one, where he kills the frontman by smashing an electric guitar over his head for taking a cigarette from his mouth. During the song's bridge, the band is seen in a bloody imagery, while the clip ends on David catching them up and taking the cassette tape out, saying that he "hate[s] this fucking song".

Live performances
Måneskin debuted "Mammamia" live, during a press conference organised one day ahead of the song's release in Berlin club SO36. On 26 October 2021, Måneskin debuted on US late night television, with their live rendition of "Mammamia", as well as their cover of "Beggin'" on The Tonight Show Starring Jimmy Fallon. On 14 November, the band performed the single on 2021 MTV Europe Music Awards, where they won an award for Best Rock. "Mammamia" was one of the songs that Måneskin played during their ALTer EGO and Coachella gigs in 2022.

Track listing 
Digital download / streaming
 "Mammamia" – 3:06

Vinyl
 "Mammamia" – 3:06
 "Touch Me" (demo version) – 3:49

Credits and personnel

"Mammamia"
 Måneskinsongwriting, production
 Damiano Davidlyrics, composition, vocals
 Victoria De Angeliscomposition, bass
 Thomas Raggicomposition, guitar
 Ethan Torchiocomposition, drums
 Fabrizio Ferraguzzoproduction
 Enrico La Farcemixing

"Touch Me" – demo version
 Måneskinsongwriting, production
 Fabrizio Ferraguzzoproduction
 Loca Pellegrinimixing

Charts

Certifications

Release history

References

External links
 

2021 songs
2021 singles
Songs written by Damiano David
Songs written by Victoria De Angelis
Måneskin songs
Sony Music singles